Darius Muasau (born February 10, 2001) is an American football linebacker who currently plays college football at the University of California, Los Angeles.

High school career 
Muasau attended Mililani High School in Hawaii, where he was a linebacker and running back. As a senior, he was named to the USA Today All-USA Hawaii Football Second Team.

Muasau committed to playing college football at Hawaii in 2018, the lone Division I FBS offer he received.

College career

Hawaii

2019 
Muasau started the season as a backup linebacker and special teamer, but was thrust into action early in the season due to injuries to the Rainbow Warriors linebacking corps. In his first career start against rival Fresno State, Muasau led the team in total tackles and also recovered a key onside kick that set up the then-game tying drive for Hawaii.

2020 
In a stellar 2020 season, Muasau led the Rainbow Warriors in tackles as well as ranking fourth in the nation at solo tackles and fifth in total tackles. He was also named the most outstanding player on defense of the 2020 New Mexico Bowl, compiling nine tackles, one sack and an interception in the performance.

Muasau was named an All-Mountain West first team selection in 2020, the only Hawaii player to garner first-team honors, as well as an honorable mention All-American by Phil Steele. He was also named a finalist for the Polynesian College Football Player of the Year Award, but ultimately lost out to Zach Wilson and Talanoa Hufanga.

2021 
Muasau had another productive season in 2021, compiling 108 total tackles, seven sacks, and five forced fumbles. After the season concluded, Muasau announced on December 28, 2021 that he would be entering the transfer portal.

UCLA 
On January 1, 2022, Muasau announced on social media that he would transfer to UCLA.

College statistics

Personal life 
Muasau's younger brother Sergio is currently an offensive lineman at Hawaii.

References

External links 
 
 Hawaii profile

2001 births
Living people
Players of American football from San Diego
Players of American football from Honolulu
American football linebackers
Hawaii Rainbow Warriors football players
UCLA Bruins football players